Lexton may refer to:

 Lexton Moy (born 1985), footballer
 Lexton, Victoria, town
 Shire of Lexton, former municipality